Sammy Ofer Stadium, also known as Haifa Municipal Stadium, is a 30,858 seats multi-purpose stadium in Haifa, Israel. Construction began in late 2009 and was completed in 2014. The stadium was developed and built by the Haifa Economic Corporation, managed by Adv. Gal Peleg.

Currently, the stadium is used mostly for football matches, hosting the home games of Maccabi Haifa and Hapoel Haifa The stadium replaced Kiryat Eliezer Stadium, which was closed in 2014 and demolished in 2015. The stadium is named after the late Israeli billionaire Sammy Ofer (1922–2011), who donated $20,000,000 to build the stadium. Ofer's contribution was 19% of the total cost of the stadium. The stadium also serves the Israel national football team for some select home matches.

History

On September 16, 2008, the Haifa Construction Committee approved the stadium's plans and gave it the green light. In August 2009, official plans for the stadium were released. In September 2009, it has been announced that the works on building the foundations of the stadium would begin at the end of September 2009.

The first official match ever at Sammy Ofer Stadium was played on August 27, 2014. Hapoel Haifa hosted Hapoel Acre (Toto Cup) and won 2–0. The first historic goal in the new stadium was scored by Hapoel Haifa striker Tosaint Ricketts. The first league match was played on September 15, 2014. Maccabi Haifa hosted Bnei Sakhnin, who they defeated by a score of 4–2. The historic first goal by a Maccabi Haifa player was scored by Israeli national team midfielder Hen Ezra during stoppage time of the first half. Over 28,000 supporters were in attendance.

The first UEFA Champions League match was played on September 30, 2015 by Maccabi Tel Aviv against Dinamo Kiev, Dinamo won 2–0 with goals by Andriy Yarmolenko and Júnior Moraes.

The first match of the Israel national football team was played on November 16, 2014. Israel hosted the Bosnia and Herzegovina national football team in the UEFA Euro 2016 qualifying match and won 3–0. The stadium was sold out, which resulted in an atmosphere beyond compare, helping Israel win their 3rd game in a row in the tournament. 

The first concert at the stadium was by Omer Adam on May 24, 2018.

International matches

Gates

See also
 List of football stadiums in Israel

References

External links

  Official website
  Municipality of Haifa
  Haifa Economic Corporation Ltd.
  Official Plans
  KSS Group
  Sammy Ofer Stadium video

Football venues in Israel
Multi-purpose stadiums in Israel
Maccabi Haifa F.C.
Sports venues completed in 2014
2014 establishments in Israel
Sports venues in Haifa